The 1990–91 New Jersey Devils season was the 17th season for the National Hockey League franchise that was established on June 11, 1974, and ninth season since the franchise relocated from Colorado prior to the 1982–83 NHL season. The season saw the team finish fourth in the Patrick Division and qualify for the playoffs for the second consecutive season, losing in the division semi-finals to the Pittsburgh Penguins. This was the first time in the franchise's 17-year history that the team qualified for the playoffs in consecutive seasons. The team would make one huge move towards their future when they drafted Martin Brodeur with their first round selection in the 1990 NHL Entry Draft.

Regular season

Season standings

Schedule and results

Playoffs

Patrick Division Semifinals

(P4) New Jersey Devils vs. (P1) Pittsburgh Penguins 

The first two games took place at Civic Arena in Pittsburgh. In game 1, the Devils won 3-1. However, in game 2, the Penguins tied the series with a 5-4 overtime win.  Games 3 and 4 were at the Meadowlands in New Jersey. Pittsburgh was victorious in game 3 by a score of 4-3, but the Devils won in game 4 4-1. Game 5 shifted back to Pittsburgh where the Devils beat the Penguins 4-2. Game 6 was back in New Jersey, where the series was evened again thanks to a Pittsburgh 4-3 win. Game 7 was back in Pittsburgh where the Penguins won the game 4-0 and won the series 4-3.

Player statistics

Regular season
Scoring

Goaltending

Playoffs
Scoring

Goaltending

Note: GP = Games played; G = Goals; A = Assists; Pts = Points; +/- = Plus/minus; PIM = Penalty minutes; PPG = Power-play goals; SHG = Short-handed goals; GWG = Game-winning goals
      MIN = Minutes played; W = Wins; L = Losses; T = Ties; GA = Goals against; GAA = Goals against average; SO = Shutouts; SA = Shots against; SV = Shots saved; SV% = Save percentage;

Awards & records

Awards

Transactions

Draft picks
The Devils' draft picks at the 1990 NHL Entry Draft.

See also
1990–91 NHL season

Notes

References

New Jersey Devils seasons
New Jersey Devils
New Jersey Devils
New Jersey Devils
New Jersey Devils
20th century in East Rutherford, New Jersey
Meadowlands Sports Complex